Port Bell is a small industrial centre in the greater metropolitan Kampala area, in Uganda. Port Bell has a rail link and a railroad ferry wharf used for International traffic across Lake Victoria to Tanzania and Kenya.

Location
Port Bell is located in Nakawa Division, one of the five administrative divisions of the city of Kampala. It is a subdivision of the greater Luzira area in the south-eastern part of the city. The coordinates of Port Bell are 0°17'20.0"N, 32°39'13.0"E (Latitude:0.288900; Longitude:32.653620).

Overview
The port is named after Henry Hesketh Bell, a British commissioner, who took over administration of Britain's interests in Uganda in 1906. Its rail link is a branch line from the Kampala-Jinja main line.

Lake Victoria ferries operate from Port Bell linking Kampala to other railhead ports on Lake Victoria including Jinja, Kisumu, Musoma, and Mwanza.

When the first stage of the Uganda Railway was completed in 1901, the railhead was at Kisumu, 12 hours journey from Port Bell by ship. Ferries brought goods by lake between Port Bell and Kisumu. It was not until 1931 that the main line of the railway from Nakuru reached Kampala and then Port Bell.

Industry
Uganda Breweries Limited, a subsidiary of East African Breweries, has a brewery and a distillery for Uganda Waragi at Port Bell.

Points of interest

The points of interest in or near Port Bell include:
 Luzira Maximum Security Prison — Has a capacity of 20,000 inmates, including about 500 on death row.
 Cipla Quality Chemical Industries Limited — this US$40 million factory is the only one in sub-Saharan Africa that manufactures triple antiretroviral drug therapy medication.
 Uganda Breweries Limited — division of East African Breweries and maker of Uganda Waragi, a triple-distilled gin and Bell beer
 Port Bell — a port on the shores of Lake Nalubaale, handlin passenger and cargo traffic destined for Kisumu, Kenya and Mwanza and Musoma in Tanzania. The port is undergoing a two-year upgrade and renovation.

Air travel
Between 1930 and 1950 Port Bell was a landing point on the Imperial Airways flying boat passenger and mail route from Southampton to Johannesburg's Vaal Dam. Port Bell linked Khartoum and Kisumu. The nearby Silver Springs Hotel was originally built by the British Overseas Airways Corporation as a rest stop for passengers between long flights. During World War II, Port Bell was also on the route connecting Cairo with Libreville.

See also
 Railway stations in Uganda
 Transport in Uganda
 Rift Valley Railways

References

External links
 About Port Bell In 2009

Neighborhoods of Kampala
Economy of Uganda
Populated places on Lake Victoria
Luzira
Nakawa Division
Ports and harbours of Uganda